Ascalenia nudicornis is a moth in the family Cosmopterigidae. It is found in South Africa.

The larvae possibly feed on Tamarix species.

References

Endemic moths of South Africa
Moths described in 1913
Ascalenia
Moths of Africa